Dylewo  is a village in the administrative district of Gmina Grunwald, within Ostróda County, Warmian-Masurian Voivodeship, in northern Poland.

The village has a population of 280.

During World War II, the Germans operated a forced labour subcamp of the Nazi prison in Barczewo in the village.

References

Dylewo